Dolichoderus extensispinus is a species of ant in the genus Dolichoderus. Described by Forel in 1915, the species is endemic to Australia, and can be found in dry sclerophyll areas to forestry regions in Queensland, where they nest under stones and forage on low vegetation and trees.

References

Dolichoderus
Hymenoptera of Australia
Insects described in 1915